Vicksburg is a village in Kalamazoo County in the U.S. state of Michigan.  The population was 3,706 at the 2020 census.  The west part of the village is in Schoolcraft Township and the east part is in Brady Township.

History
John Vickers, the town's namesake, settled in the area in 1831. It was incorporated as a village of the state in 1871. A Michigan Registered Historic Site plaque reads:
VICKERS' MILL:  In 1831, John Vickers built a brush dam over the eight-foot waterfall on Portage Creek and erected a log grist mill.  The mill is believed to have been the first mill in Kalamazoo County.  The dam created a pond that supplied water power to the mill and formed the sizeable Sunset Lake, around which pioneers built homes and set up businesses.  Vickers died in 1842.  On October 18, 1871, the village was incorporated as Brady, but one day later, a petition passed to rename it Vicksburg.

Geography
Vicksburg is located on the shore of Sunset Lake.

Demographics

2010 census
As of the census of 2010, there were 2,906 people, 1,120 households, and 773 families residing in the village. The racial makeup of the village was 95.9% White, 0.6% African American, 0.3% Native American, 0.6% Asian, 0.6% from other races, and 2.1% from two or more races. Hispanic or Latino of any race were 3.2% of the population.

There were 1,120 households, of which 39.8% had children under the age of 18 living with them, 48.4% were married couples living together, 14.6% had a female householder with no husband present, 6.1% had a male householder with no wife present, and 31.0% were non-families. 25.6% of all households were made up of individuals, and 8.6% had someone living alone who was 65 years of age or older. The average household size was 2.59, and the average family size was 3.12.

The median age in the village was 33 years. 28.4% of residents were under the age of 18; 7.6% were between the ages of 18 and 24; 29.3% were from 25 to 44; 23.4% were from 45 to 64; and 11.3% were 65 years of age or older. The gender makeup of the village was 49.3% male and 50.7% female.

Education
Public education is provided by the Vicksburg Community Schools, which serves the village and the surrounding area. Vicksburg High School, Vicksburg Middle School, and Sunset Lake Elementary School are in the village, with two additional elementary schools located in nearby rural areas.

Events
Each year during the second weekend in June, Vicksburg hosts a classic car show.

Vicksburg Car Show 2009 
Vicksburg Car Show 2008 
Vicksburg Car Show 2007
Vicksburg Car Show 2006

Annual Summer Festival - Located at the Vicksburg Recreation Park, The Vicksburg Lions Club has hosted this event for 37 years. The festival features Otto's Beer & Bratwurst Tent, Family Night, Volleyball and Horseshoe Tournaments, and Live Music. The B&B Annual Summer Festival begins the third Thursday in July and runs through Saturday night.

Christmas in the Village - Located within the whole town of Vicksburg, This event takes place every year in December with family fun events and a parade. It finishes off with the Christmas Tree lighting ceremony.

Vicksburg in the national media
On November 14, 1977 (and continued on November 21, 1977), author Bil Gilbert wrote a long feature story in Sports Illustrated on the impact of high school football on life in a small town.  He chose to write about Vicksburg High School and mentioned many local citizens and establishments in his article.

Notable people
 Joe Gembis, head football coach, Wayne State University
 William Lucking, actor
 General Glenn K. Otis, US Army
 Leon Roberts, Major League Baseball outfielder, was born in Vicksburg
 Bill Snyder, pitcher for the Washington Senators 1919-1920
 Jim Thurman, TV writer, director and producer

References

External links

 Village of Vicksburg, Michigan
 

Villages in Kalamazoo County, Michigan
Villages in Michigan
Kalamazoo–Portage metropolitan area
Populated places established in 1871
1871 establishments in Michigan